Kelvin Anthony Sheppard (born January 2, 1988) is a former American football linebacker and coach who is the inside linebackers coach for the Detroit Lions of the National Football League (NFL). He was drafted by the Buffalo Bills in the third round of the 2011 NFL Draft. He played college football at LSU.

Professional career

Buffalo Bills
The Buffalo Bills selected Sheppard in the third round (68th overall) of the 2011 NFL Draft.

Indianapolis Colts
On April 29, 2013, Sheppard was traded to the Indianapolis Colts for Jerry Hughes. He played in 15 games with seven starts in 2013, recording 46 tackles and one sack.

On August 30, 2014, Sheppard was released by the Colts.

Miami Dolphins
On September 8, 2014, Sheppard signed with the Miami Dolphins. In 2015, Sheppard played in all 16 games with 13 starts, recording a career-high 105 tackles.

New York Giants
On April 11, 2016, Sheppard signed with the New York Giants. He played in all 16 games, starting 10, recording 50 tackles and two passes defensed.

Chicago Bears
On August 18, 2017, Sheppard signed with the Chicago Bears. He was released on September 2, 2017.

New York Giants (second stint)
On November 7, 2017, Sheppard signed with the Giants. Sheppard recorded his first and second career interceptions on December 31, 2017 during Week 17 when he picked off Washington Redskins quarterback Kirk Cousins twice.

Detroit Lions
On October 31, 2018, Sheppard was signed by the Detroit Lions.

LSU Tigers
Sheppard was named director of player development at LSU in March 2020. He replaced Kevin Faulk who held the position prior to Sheppard.

Coaching career
Sheppard was hired by the Detroit Lions as the team’s outside linebackers coach on February 3, 2021. In 2022 he went from coaching the outside linebackers to the inside linebackers.

Personal life
Sheppard is the first cousin of Chicago Bears wide receiver, Dwayne Harris.

References

External links
Buffalo Bills bio
LSU Tigers bio

1988 births
Living people
Players of American football from Atlanta
American football linebackers
LSU Tigers football players
Buffalo Bills players
Indianapolis Colts players
Miami Dolphins players
New York Giants players
Chicago Bears players
Detroit Lions players
Detroit Lions coaches